The Tree River (Kogluktualuk) is a river in Nunavut, Canada. It flows into Coronation Gulf, an arm of the Arctic Ocean.

Glacial landforms, such as a kame delta, are represented in the area of the Tree River.

This area was the ancestral home of several Copper Inuit bands, including the Kogluktualugmiut (also known as Utkusiksaligmiut), who lived along its shores; the Pingangnaktogmiut, who lived west of the river; and the Nagyuktogmiut (also known as Killinermiut), who lived east of Tree River.

See also
List of rivers of the Northwest Territories
List of rivers of Nunavut

References

External links
 Photos, Geological Survey of Canada:
 Gorge east of Tree River
 Tree River's marine silt
 Tree River's glacial landscape in metasedimentary rock
 Tree River's dykes

Rivers of Kitikmeot Region
Rivers of the Northwest Territories
Former populated places in the Kitikmeot Region
Kames